The Low Cost Miniature Cruise Missile (LCMCM) is a Lockheed Martin program to develop a small, affordable cruise missile which will fit inside the internal weapons bay of the F-22 Raptor and F-35 Lightning II.

Specifications
 Length: ~144 in.
 Weight: ~1000 lbs
 Range: 750–1000 miles

See also
 SMACM

References

Cruise missiles of the United States

ar:صاروخ كروز المصغر قليل التكلفة
de:Low Cost Autonomous Attack System
sl:LOCAAS